Hold It Down may refer to:

Hold It Down (song)
Hold It Down (Das EFX album)
Hold It Down (Madball album)